Mokhtar Tlili (born 8 October 1942) is a Tunisian football manager. He coached the Tunisia national football team.

He was a defender at CS Cheminots, he interrupts his playing career at the age of 25 years to become a coach. He quickly builds a reputation, which allows him to lead the majority of the major Tunisian clubs, obtaining a rich track record and a career in the Gulf countries and Libya.
In October 2015, he was appointed as the Goodwill Ambassador of the International Mini-Football Federation.

In October 2017, he guided the Tunisian team in 2017 WMF World Cup and reached the quarter-finals.

References

1942 births
Living people
Tunisian footballers
CS Cheminots players
Association footballers not categorized by position
Tunisian football managers
Sfax Railways Sports managers
CS Hammam-Lif managers
Espérance Sportive de Tunis managers
Club Africain football managers
Club Athlétique Bizertin managers
CS Sfaxien managers
Tunisia national football team managers
ES Zarzis managers
Olympique Béja managers
US Monastir (football) managers
AS Djerba managers
Palestine national football team managers
Najran SC managers
AS Gabès managers
Saudi Professional League managers
Expatriate football managers in Saudi Arabia
Tunisian expatriate sportspeople in Saudi Arabia